May Erlewine (born May 13, 1983) is a musician from Big Rapids, Michigan. She sings and plays the guitar, piano, violin, and other instruments. She is also a songwriter, with over 15 albums of original work published since the beginning of her career, in the early 2000s. Her songs have been covered by other artists, on the local and national music scenes in the United States.

Erlewine is part of the Earthwork Music collective, an independent label that promotes original music from regional artists. Earthwork was founded by Erlewine's former husband, Samuel Seth Bernard, who is a musician and singer-songwriter himself. The two had one child together. Erlewine has performed solo, as a duet with Max Lockwood, with the May Erlewine band, with May Erlewine and the Motivations, with the Sweet Water Warblers, and with other bands.

Work
May Erlewine was born to a musical family; her father Michael Erlewine was a member of the Michigan blues band The Prime Movers and her uncle is a luthier. Her work shows a variety of musical influences, such as folk, bluegrass, blues, rock & roll and others. It has grown from her experience as a child, home-schooled and surrounded by music, and as a teenager, when she hitch-hiked across North America, riding freight trains and performing on the streets.

Erlewine has described how her songs are the expression of her experiences. She spends much of each year writing songs and performing in Northern Michigan.

In their 2007 album Big Old Life, the New England band Rani Arbo and Daisy Mayhem covered one of her songs, "Shine On".

The movie Old Fashioned, released in 2014, included her performance of "Joy", along with the author, Ralston Bowles, in the original soundtrack.

In 2015, "Shine On" was selected and performed by singer Sawyer Fredericks in the final round of NBC's TV show The Voice, which he won. Coincidentally, Joshua Davis, a singer-songwriter who is part of May's music collective, Earthwork Music, was also a finalist on The Voice that year; he went all the way to the final round.

Erlewine is featured in the Rise Again song book released in 2016, a sequel to the popular folk music fake book Rise Up Singing, containing chords, lyrics, and sources. The two original May Erlewine songs included in the second edition are: Rise Up Singing, from her 2007 album Mother Moon, and Shine On, from the 2005 Seth & May album, jointly released with her then husband, Seth Bernard.

In late 2018, Erlewine played a series of collaborative shows with fellow singer-songwriters Sav Buist and Katie Larson (both from The Accidentals) and Beth Nielsen Chapman.

Discography
 Sleepless (May Erlewine, 2003)
 Heart Song (May Erlewine, 2004)
 Seth Bernard and Daisy May (Seth Bernard & May Erlewine, 2005)
 Mother Moon (May Erlewine, 2007)
 Snow Songs (May Erlewine, 2008)
 Welcome Back (Seth Bernard & May Erlewine, 2009)
 Love Labor (May Erlewine, 2009)
 Golden (May Erlewine, 2010)
 Wedding EP (Seth Bernard & May Erlewine, 2011)
 New Flower (Seth Bernard & May Erlewine, 2011)
 The Long Way Home (May Erlewine, 2012)
 We Can Change / Siren Song (Seth Bernard & May Erlewine, 2013)
 Where We Are (May Erlewine, 2014)
 Shine On (May Erlewine, 2015)
 New Flower, Volume 2 (Seth Bernard & May Erlewine, 2015)
 Lean Into the Wind (May Erlewine, 2016)
 The Little Things EP (May Erlewine, 2016)
 With You (The Sweet Water Warblers, 2017)
 Mother Lion (May Erlewine, 2017)
 In The Night (The Motivations, 2019)
 Second Sight (May Erlewine, 2019)
 Anyway (May Erlewine & Woody Goss, 2020)
 Tiny Beautiful Things (May Erlewine, 2022)

Awards and nominations
 2011 WYCE Jammie Award "Album of the Year" for Golden
 2018 WYCE Jammie Award "Album of the Year" for Mother Lion
 2018 WYCE Jammie Award "Song of the Year" for "Never One Thing"

Family
May Erlewine has a daughter named Iris, born in January 2014. Erlewine's former husband is singer-songwriter Samuel Seth Bernard.

References

External links
Official site 
Earthwork Music

Living people
Musicians from Michigan
1983 births